U3 small nucleolar RNA-interacting protein 2 is a protein that in humans is encoded by the RRP9 gene.

See also

 Fibrillarin
 Small nucleolar RNA U3
 RCL1
 RRP9
 UTP6
 UTP11L
 UTP14A
 UTP15

References

Further reading

External links 
 PDBe-KB provides an overview of all the structure information available in the PDB for Human U3 small nucleolar RNA-interacting protein 2 (RRP9)